is  the former Head coach of the Sendai 89ers in the Japanese B.League.

Head coaching record

|- 
| style="text-align:left;"|Toyota Antelopes
| style="text-align:left;"|2012-13
| 29||22||7|||| style="text-align:center;"|2nd|||6||3||3||
| style="text-align:center;"|Runners-up
|-
| style="text-align:left;"|Toyota Antelopes
| style="text-align:left;"|2013-14
| 33||26||7|||| style="text-align:center;"|2nd|||3||1||2||
| style="text-align:center;"|3rd
|-
| style="text-align:left;"|Toyota Antelopes
| style="text-align:left;"|2014-15
| 30||20||10|||| style="text-align:center;"|4th|||2||0||2||
| style="text-align:center;"|4th
|-
| style="text-align:left;"|Sendai 89ers
| style="text-align:left;"|2017
| 28||13||15|||| style="text-align:center;"|Fired|||-||-||-||
| style="text-align:center;"|-
|-
|-

References

1966 births
Living people
Akita Isuzu/Isuzu Motors Lynx/Giga Cats players
Japanese basketball coaches
Rizing Zephyr Fukuoka coaches
Sendai 89ers coaches